Kathryn Hughes  (born 1959) is a British academic, journalist and biographer. Educated at Lady Margaret Hall, Oxford University and the University of East Anglia (UEA); her doctorate in Victorian history was developed into her first book, The Victorian Governess. She is the Director of Creative Non-Fiction at the University of East Anglia,

Hughes' book George Eliot: The Last Victorian was awarded the 1999 James Tait Black Memorial Prize for biography, and her 2005 biography of Isabella Beeton, The Short Life and Long Times of Mrs Beeton was also well-received, and made the long list for the Samuel Johnson Prize. (Hughes's UEA website stated that the book had made the shortlist, but this turned out not to be true). Reviewing Mrs Beeton in the UK daily newspaper The Independent, Frances Spalding wrote: "There is seemingly no aspect of Victorian life that Kathryn Hughes cannot assimilate and understand from the inside. This is living history, in which massive research and impeccable scholarship is handled with invigorating panache".

Hughes has also reviewed and written for The Guardian, The Economist and The Times Literary Supplement. An occasional presenter of Open Book on BBC Radio 4, she also contributes to the same network's Saturday Review. She is a Fellow of the Royal Historical Society and the Royal Society of Literature.

Bibliography

Books
  (Bloomsbury pbk )

Critical studies and reviews of Hughes' work
Victorians undone

References

1959 births
Living people
Academics of the University of East Anglia
Alumni of Lady Margaret Hall, Oxford
Alumni of the University of East Anglia
BBC Radio 4 presenters
British journalists
British women journalists
Fellows of the Royal Historical Society
Fellows of the Royal Society of Literature
James Tait Black Memorial Prize recipients
British women historians
British radio presenters
British women radio presenters